Please add names of notable painters with a Wikipedia page, in precise English alphabetical order, using U.S. spelling conventions. Country and regional names refer to where painters worked for long periods, not to personal allegiances.

Qi Baishi (齊白石, 1864–1957), Chinese painter and seal carver
Qian Du (錢杜, 1764–1844), Chinese painter
Qian Gu (錢谷, 1508 – c. 1578), Chinese painter
Qian Xuan (錢選, 1235–1305), Chinese painter
Qiu Ying (仇英, 1494–1552), Chinese gongbi painter
Qu Leilei (曲磊磊, born 1951), Chinese/English calligrapher, painter and author
Domenico Quaglio the Younger (1787–1837), German painter, engraver and architect
Arthur Quartley (1839–1886), American painter
Enguerrand Quarton (c. 1410 – c. 1466), French painter and manuscript illuminator
Pieter Jansz Quast (1606–1647), Dutch painter and draftsman
Harvey Quaytman (1937–2002), American painter
August Querfurt (1696–1761), Austrian painter
José Comas Quesada (1928–1993), Canary Islands painter
François Quesnel (c. 1543 – 1619), French painter
Annie Abernethie Pirie Quibell (1862–1927), Scottish artist and archaeologist
John Quidor (1801–1881), American painter
Benito Quinquela Martín (1890–1977), Argentine painter
Quirizio di Giovanni da Murano (fl. c. 1460–1478), Italian painter

References
References can be found under each entry.

Q